Gabriella Cecchi (born 3 November 1944) is an Italian pianist, music educator and composer. She was born in Ricco del Golfo, La Spezia, and began her study of music at the age of 16. She studied in Lucca, Genoa and composition with Franco Donatoni at the Chigiana Music Academy in Siena.

After completing her studies, Cecchi worked as a music teacher and composer. She taught music at the Italian State School and performed in a duo for several years. She also worked as a music critic for the daily newspaper La Nazione and for monthly magazines. Her music has been performed internationally and has been broadcast on Radio RaiTre. She was a recipient of the Athena prize in 1988, and is a co-founder of the Italian Composers Foundation.

Selected works
Cecchi composes solo pieces, chamber music and works for orchestra, often with experimental, multimedia and complex structures. Selected works include:
Intersezioni for piano (1982)
Assonanze for harpsichord (1984)
Imagenes de la Argentina theater music (2005)
Sères for string quartet (1984) 
Favoletta, instrumental

References

Italian women classical composers
1944 births
Living people
Italian classical composers
Italian music educators
People from La Spezia
20th-century classical composers
20th-century Italian composers
Women music educators
20th-century women composers
20th-century Italian women